Stenoma paropta is a moth of the family Depressariidae. It is found in the French Guiana.

The wingspan is 18–19 mm. The forewings are light ochreous yellow, the dorsal three-fifths, except towards the base, suffused with pale rosy-brownish, the costa greenish yellow. The hindwings are whitish yellowish, in females very faintly greyish tinged on the dorsal half.

References

Moths described in 1916
Taxa named by Edward Meyrick
Stenoma